In mathematics, the Loomis–Whitney inequality is a result in geometry, which in its simplest form, allows one to estimate the "size" of a -dimensional set by the sizes of its -dimensional projections. The inequality has applications in incidence geometry, the study of so-called "lattice animals", and other areas.

The result is named after the American mathematicians Lynn Harold Loomis and Hassler Whitney, and was published in 1949.

Statement of the inequality
Fix a dimension  and consider the projections

For each 1 ≤ j ≤ d, let

Then the Loomis–Whitney inequality holds:

Equivalently, taking  we have

implying

A special case
The Loomis–Whitney inequality can be used to relate the Lebesgue measure of a subset of Euclidean space  to its "average widths" in the coordinate directions. This is in fact the original version published by Loomis and Whitney in 1949 (the above is a generalization).

be the indicator function of the projection of E onto the jth coordinate hyperplane. It follows that for any point x in E,

Hence, by the Loomis–Whitney inequality,

and hence

The quantity

This interpretation of the Loomis–Whitney inequality also holds if we consider a finite subset of Euclidean space and replace Lebesgue measure by counting measure.

The following proof is the original one

Corollary. Since , we get a loose isoperimetric inequality:

Generalizations
The Loomis–Whitney inequality is a special case of the Brascamp–Lieb inequality, in which the projections πj above are replaced by more general linear maps, not necessarily all mapping onto spaces of the same dimension.

References

Sources

  

Incidence geometry
Geometric inequalities